The 1955 Chico State Wildcats football team represented Chico State College—now known as California State University, Chico—as a member of the Far Western Conference (FWC) during the 1955 college football season. Led by second-year head coach Gus Manolis, Chico State compiled an overall record of 7–2 with a mark of 5–0 in conference play, placing first in the FWC, although no conference championship was awarded. The team outscored its opponents 194 to 108 for the season. The Wildcats played home games at Chico High School Stadium in Chico, California.

Schedule

Notes

References

Chico State
Chico State Wildcats football seasons
Chico State Wildcats football